The fourth season of MasterChef South Africa was announced on 17 August 2021 and began airing on 28 February 2022 on M-Net (DStv channel 101) after a seven-year hiatus.

The new judges introduced for this season are Zola Nene, Gregory Czarnecki and Justine Drake. Filming was done through a new production company, Homebrew Films, at the Victoria & Alfred Waterfront in Cape Town, South Africa. It wrapped up in November 2021.

The finale aired on 31 March 2022, where Shawn Godfrey took the title of MasterChef South Africa 2022.

Contestants

Top 20

Elimination Table 

  (WINNER) This chef won the competition.
  (RUNNER-UP) This chef received second place in the competition.
  (WIN) The chef won the individual challenge (Mystery Box Challenge or Invention Test).
 (WIN) The chef was on the winning team in the Team Challenge and was safe from the Pressure Test.
  (HIGH) The chef was one of the top entries in the Mystery Box Challenge or Invention Test but didn't win.
  (CC) The chef received the advantage of competing against a celebrity chef in this challenge. If they won, they advanced farther on in the competition, skipping a number of challenges. The chef could not be eliminated after this challenge.
  (IMM) The chef won Immunity in the previous challenge and was safe from cooking.
  (IN) The chef was not selected as a top entry or bottom entry in the challenge.
  (PT) The chef was on the losing team in the Team Challenge, competed in the Pressure Test, and advanced.
  (LOW) The chef was one of the bottom entries in an individual elimination challenge, but was not the last person to advance.
  (LOW) The chef was one of the bottom entries in an individual elimination challenge, and was the last person to advance.
  (ELIM) The chef was eliminated from MasterChef.

Episodes

References 

South Africa (season 4)
2022 South African television seasons